

2001–02

Marv Albert/Bill Walton/Steve Jones/Jim Gray
Mike Breen or Tom Hammond/P.J. Carlesimo/Lewis Johnson
Tom Hammond or Mike Breen/Mike Dunleavy/Andrea Joyce

2000–01

Marv Albert/Doug Collins/Jim Gray
Tom Hammond or Mike Breen/Bill Walton/Steve Jones/Lewis Johnson
Mike Breen/Matt Guokas/Andrea Joyce

This season marked the return of Marv Albert to NBC coverage.

1999–2000

Bob Costas/Doug Collins/Ahmad Rashad
Tom Hammond/Bill Walton/Steve Jones/Jim Gray
Mike Breen/Matt Guokas

1998–99

Bob Costas/Doug Collins/Ahmad Rashad
Tom Hammond/Bill Walton/Steve Jones/Jim Gray
Mike Breen/Matt Guokas

1997–98

Bob Costas/Doug Collins/Isiah Thomas/Ahmad Rashad
Tom Hammond or Greg Gumbel (Gumbel left NBC after Super Bowl XXXII to return to CBS)/Bill Walton/Steve Jones/Jim Gray 
Mike Breen or Tom Hammond/Matt Guokas

Shortly before the 1997–98 NBA season began, Marv Albert was fired following being charged with sexual assault.

1996–97

Marv Albert/Matt Guokas/Ahmad Rashad
Greg Gumbel/Bill Walton/Steve Jones/Jim Gray
Tom Hammond/Dan Issel

1995–96

Marv Albert/Matt Guokas/Ahmad Rashad
Greg Gumbel/Bill Walton/Steve Jones/Hannah Storm
Tom Hammond/Dan Issel

1994–95

Marv Albert/Matt Guokas
Greg Gumbel/Bill Walton/Steve Jones
Tom Hammond/Ron Rothstein

1993–94

Marv Albert/Matt Guokas
Dick Enberg/Bill Walton/Steve Jones
Tom Hammond/Ron Rothstein

1992–93

Marv Albert/Mike Fratello
Dick Enberg or Tom Hammond/Steve Jones/Magic Johnson

1991–92

Marv Albert/Mike Fratello
Dick Enberg/Steve Jones/Magic Johnson

1990–91

Marv Albert/Mike Fratello
Dick Enberg/Steve Jones
Bob Costas/Pat Riley
Don Criqui/Al McGuire or Ron Rothstein

Sources
Sports Broadcast History Forums
1990-'91 NBA Announcing Crews
1991-'92 NBA Announcing Crews
1992-'93 NBA Announcing Crews
1993-'94 NBA Announcing Crews
1994-'95 NBA Announcing Crews
1995-'96 NBA Announcing Crews
1996-'97 NBA Announcing Crews
1997-'98 NBA Announcing Crews
1999 NBA Announcing Crews
1999-2000 NBA Announcing Crews
2000-'01 NBA Announcing Crews
2001-'02 NBA Announcing Crews

NBC broadcasting teams
NBC broadcasting teams
Broadcasters